Reckershausen is an Ortsgemeinde – a municipality belonging to a Verbandsgemeinde, a kind of collective municipality – in the Rhein-Hunsrück-Kreis (district) in Rhineland-Palatinate, Germany. It belongs to the Verbandsgemeinde of Kirchberg, whose seat is in the like-named town.

Geography

Location
The municipality lies in the Hunsrück and encompasses an area of 8.19 km², of which 4.52 km² is wooded. The rural residential community lies roughly 4 km north of Kirchberg.

History
In 1072, Reckershausen had its first documentary mention. Reckershausen was an area subject to the provost's office at Ravengiersburg Monastery. When the monastery was dissolved by the Dukes of Palatinate-Simmern in 1566, the Reformation was introduced.

In 1672 the village passed to Electoral Palatinate. Beginning in 1794, Reckershausen lay under French rule. In 1815 it was assigned to the Kingdom of Prussia at the Congress of Vienna. Since 1946, it has been part of the then newly founded state of Rhineland-Palatinate.

Politics

Municipal council
The council is made up of 8 council members, who were elected by majority vote at the municipal election held on 7 June 2009, and the honorary mayor as chairwoman.

Mayor
Reckershausen's mayor is Christian Gehre.

Coat of arms
The German blazon reads: 

The municipality's arms might in English heraldic language be described thus: Per pale chequy of fifteen gules and argent and Or trellised sable surmounted by a hammer and a pick per saltire of the same, on a chief of the fourth a lion passant of the third armed and langued of the first.

The lion in the chief refers to the former landholders, the Counts Palatine of the Rhine and the Dukes of Simmern. Reckershausen lay within the area subject to the provost's office at Ravengiersburg Monastery. Until this foundation was dissolved in 1566, these noblemen were its Vögte, and until 1707 the lords over the provost's office. The “chequy” pattern on the dexter (armsbearer's right, viewer's left) side refers to the “Hinder” County of Sponheim, which had in Reckershausen many peasant subjects and 19 “farmyards”. The trellis on the sinister (armsbearer's left, viewer's right) side is meant to look like the mesh of a sieve, for sieve making and selling was in centuries gone by an important income earner for Reckershausen. The hammer and pick refer to mining within the municipality's limits.

The arms have been borne since 1990.

Culture and sightseeing

Buildings
The following are listed buildings or sites in Rhineland-Palatinate’s Directory of Cultural Monuments:
 Saint Thecla's Catholic Church (Kirche St. Thekla), Kirchberger Straße 10 – Baroque Revival aisleless church, 1923-1935, architects Eduard Endler, Cologne, and Marx, Trier
 Kirchberger Straße, graveyard – sandstone graveyard cross, 19th century

Sport and leisure
Reckershausen also has a barefoot park and a natural swimming pool.

References

External links

 Municipality’s official webpage 

Rhein-Hunsrück-Kreis